Daniel Whitney may refer to:
 Daniel Lawrence Whitney, better known as Larry the Cable Guy
 Daniel D. Whitney, mayor of Brooklyn, 1886–1887
 Daniel Whitney (entrepreneur) (1795–1862), entrepreneur in territorial Wisconsin